The 2002 Samsung-PBA Governors Cup Finals was the best-of-7 basketball championship series of the 2002 PBA Governors Cup and the conclusion of the conference's playoffs. The Purefoods Tender Juicy Hotdogs and Alaska Aces played for the 81st championship contested by the league. 

The Purefoods Tender Juicy Hotdogs captured their 1st title in five years and sixth overall crown, coming back from a 0–2 overhaul and defeated the Alaska Aces in a seven-game series, it was also the first championship of the Purefoods franchise under a new ownership San Miguel Corporation, the finals victory made rookie coach Ryan Gregorio the youngest mentor to lead his team to a PBA title.

Series scoring summary

Games summary

Game 1

The aces forced the hotdogs into costly turnovers as Derrick Brown flubbed an attempt at point-blank while Rey Evangelista and Kerby Raymundo missed their shots down the stretch. The hotdogs were trying to come back from a 71–74 deficit in the last 46 seconds but Ron Riley and Bryan Gahol alternated in handcuffing Brown as the aces pulled away.

Game 2

Ron Riley hit three of his team's five triples in the third quarter as the aces slowly broke loose at 71–62 entering the fourth period. The game went into two overtimes, John Arigo missed a game-clinching running jumper with three seconds left in regulation, forcing the first extension, Bryan Gahol flubbed a free throw from a potential three-point play with 8.9 seconds remaining and threw away a finger roll, forcing the second overtime.

Game 3

Game 4

Game 5

The hotdogs built a 42–31 spread at halftime and padded the lead at 64–44, a few minutes left in the third quarter. Alaska coach Tim Cone was assessed a second technical foul and was ejected during the opening minutes of the final period, Ron Riley and John Arigo tried to rally the aces to trimmed the gap, 62–75, but Derrick Brown proved to be unstoppable as he led the attack for the hotdogs.

Game 6

The aces smothered the hotdogs in the third quarter and went to Rodney Santos, James Head and Ron Riley on the offensive end, a triple by Santos midway in the third period set the stage for a rout as Alaska took a comfortable 61–45 lead going into the last 10 minutes, the hotdogs suddenly crumbled without Kelvin Price on the floor. Purefoods coach Ryan Gregorio opted to save Price for last and left Derrick Brown to contend with Head and Riley.

Game 7

The hotdogs sizzled hot and started strong, taking a 24–10 advantage at the end of the first quarter. The aces mounted a 16–4 run in the third quarter to come close but the hotdogs simply quelled the uprising, old reliables Ronnie Magsanoc and Alvin Patrimonio had their shining moments, a Magsanoc' triple and Derrick Brown's seven straight markers in the fourth halted Alaska's last-ditch stand.

Rosters

Broadcast notes

References

2002
2002 PBA season
Alaska Aces (PBA) games
Magnolia Hotshots games
PBA Governors' Cup Finals